St John the Baptist's Church is in Market Street, Earlestown, St Helens, Merseyside, England. It is an active Anglican parish church in the deanery of Winwick, the archdeaconry of Warrington, and the diocese of Liverpool. Its benefice is united with those of St Peter, Newton-in-Makerfield, All Saints, Newton-le-Willows, and Emmanuel Wargrave, Newton-le-Willows.  Revd Dr Chris Stafford is currently the Team Rector for the Benefice.

History

In the 1870s the population of Earlestown was growing. At that time it was in the parish of St Peter, Newton-in-Makerfield, whose rector was Canon Whalley. The architects Whalley and Fry of Dover created plans for a church to seat 900 people, with a tower, at an estimated cost of £16,000.  The foundation stone of the church was laid on 4 August 1875. There was insufficient money to build the church as it was originally planned, and a smaller church seating 600 people, and without a tower, was consecrated on 6 January 1879 by the Assistant Bishop of Chester. In 1925–26 the church was extended by half a bay, providing 90 extra seats, and the base of a tower was built. The work was carried out by the Lancaster architects Austin and Paley at a cost of about £6,000. The tower was never completed. In the 1970s an annexe was added to the west end of the tower.

Architecture

The church is constructed in yellow sandstone with red sandstone dressings; the annexe is in concrete. The plan consists of a 3½-bay nave with a clerestory, north and south aisles, and an apsidal chancel with north and south vestries. At the west end is the base of the uncompleted tower, and an attached single-storey annexe. The windows are lancets containing Geometrical tracery. The interior of the church has been re-ordered, with removal of choir stall and pews, and with a platform extending to the west of the chancel arch. The font and the pulpit are both in stone with alabaster shafts. In the east window is stained glass by Shrigley and Hunt.

See also

List of ecclesiastical works by Austin and Paley (1916–44)

Notes and references
Notes

Citations

Church of England church buildings in Merseyside
Churches completed in 1926
19th-century Church of England church buildings
Gothic Revival church buildings in England
Gothic Revival architecture in Merseyside
Anglican Diocese of Liverpool
Austin and Paley buildings
Newton-le-Willows